Jigme Tshering (born 18 October 1959), is an archer who internationally represented Bhutan.

Tshering competed for Bhutan at the 1988 Summer Olympics held in Seoul, he finished 80th in the individual event and 22nd in the team event.

References

External links
 

1959 births
Living people
Olympic archers of Bhutan
Archers at the 1988 Summer Olympics
Bhutanese male archers